The Nokia 2690 is a mobile phone released by Nokia in March 2010. It operates on GSM quad band frequency 850, 900, 1800 and 1900 MHz, with automatic switching between frequencies. It has dimensions of 107.5 × 45.5 × 13.8 mm and weighs 80.7 grams.

Technical specifications

Key features
 Digital camera (640 × 480) and video recorder (176 × 144)
 MP3, ringtones and user-created ringtones (Voice Recorder)
 FM radio
 Bluetooth 2.0
 SMS, MMS, email, and Nokia Xpress Audio Messaging
 500 MB internal dynamic memory, microSD memory card slot with hot swap, max. 8 GB

Dimensions
 Volume: 58.8 cc
 Weight: 80.7 g
 Length: 107.5 mm
 Width: 45.5 mm
 Thickness: 13.8 mm

Display
 1.8 inch, 262,144 colors, 128 × 160 pixels

Imaging
 0.3 MP Camera/VGA (640 × 480, 176 × 144 video)
 TFT color display

Multimedia
 Camera (photo and video recorder)
 Music player (AMR, AMR-WB, MIDI, MXMF, MP3, AAC, MP4/M4A/3GP/3GA (AAC, AAC+, eAAC+, AMR, AMR-WB), X-Tone, WAV (PCM, a-law, mu-law, ADPCM), WMA (WMA9, WMA10)
 Video player (174 × 144 3GP)
 Voice recorder
 FM radio with RDS support

Messaging
 Email supports POP3, IMP4 and SMTP protocols
 Nokia XpressAudio Messaging (sends greetings with short voice clips)
 SMS text messages
 MMS messaging with pictures

Java applications
 MMS 1.3 (supports 300 KB size)
 Nokia Xpress Audio Messaging tiit

Connectivity
 Photo and data sharing with Bluetooth 2.0 and USB

Browsing
 Opera Mini browser
 Built-in browser.

Power management
 Battery: BL-4C
 Capacity: 860 mAh 
 Talk time: Up to 270 minutes (GSM)
 Stand-by: Up to 335 hours (GSM)

Sales package contents
 Nokia 2690
 Nokia battery BL-4C
 Nokia Stereo Headset WH-102
 Nokia Compact Charger AC-3
 User Guide

Operating system
 Series 40 v2 (v10.10 inbuild)

Available colors
 White Silver
 Graphite
 Hot Pink
 Blue

References
 

2690
Mobile phones introduced in 2010